Eric Martinot is senior research director with the Institute for Sustainable Energy Policies in Tokyo, Japan, specialising in renewable energy commercialization. He is author of the 2013 REN21 Renewables Global Futures Report, and  former lead author of the REN21 Renewables Global Status Report (2005–2010), an annual compilation of progress with renewable energy worldwide.

From 2005 to 2008 Martinot lived in Beijing, where he was senior visiting scholar at Tsinghua University and researched China's approach to renewable energy use. From 2000 to 2003, he was senior energy analyst with the World Bank (Washington DC) where he managed renewable energy projects for developing countries.

Eric Martinot has written 70 publications on sustainable energy. He has M.A. and Ph.D. degrees in Energy and Resources from the University of California at Berkeley (1991 and 1995) and a B.S. in Electrical Engineering from MIT (1984).

See also
Amory Lovins
Benjamin K. Sovacool
Stephen Thomas (economist)
Mark Diesendorf
Kick The Fossil Fuel Habit
Energy policy
International Renewable Energy Agency (IRENA)
Reegle (Information Gateway for Renewable Energy and Energy Efficiency)

References

External links
Institute for Sustainable Energy Policies Japanese & English
Renewables 2010: Global Status Report
 Renewables 2011: Global Status Report
Renewables 2012: Global Status Report
Renewables 2013: Global Status Report

People associated with renewable energy
Renewable energy commercialization
Living people
Year of birth missing (living people)